Noryangjin Fisheries Wholesale Market or shortly Noryangjin Fish Market (Hangul: 노량진 수산시장) is an extensive farmers fish market in the neighborhood of Noryangjin-dong in Dongjak-gu, Seoul, South Korea. It is located east of 63 Building, and just south of the Han River. Metro line One passes through at Noryangin station near-by. Exit the station at exit 1 and walk under the bridge.

Noryangjin Fish Market was established in 1927 as Gyeongseong Susan (Hangul: 경성수산) on Uijuro(Hangul: 의주로) in Jung-gu near Seoul Station and moved to its current location in central Seoul in 1971.

In a poll of nearly 2,000 foreign visitors, conducted by the Seoul Metropolitan Government in November 2011, stated that visiting the Market is one of their favorite activities in Seoul.

Gallery

See also
List of markets in South Korea
List of South Korean tourist attractions

References

External links
Official site 
 Noryangjin Marine Products Market

Dongjak District
Retail markets in Seoul
Fish markets
Wholesale markets